The Lord of the Rings is a fantasy novel by J. R. R. Tolkien.

The Lord of the Rings may also refer to:

Arts and entertainment

Films 
 The Lord of the Rings (1978 film), an animated film by Ralph Bakshi
 The Lord of the Rings (film series), a trilogy of films by Peter Jackson (2001–2003)
 The Lord of the Rings: The Fellowship of the Ring (2001)
 The Lord of the Rings: The Two Towers (2002)
 The Lord of the Rings: The Return of the King (2003)

Games and toys
 Lord of the Rings (board game), a board game by Reiner Knizia
 Lord of the Rings (Heritage Models), a set of miniatures
 The Lord of the Rings: The Battle for Middle-earth, an RTS game by Electronic Arts
 The Lord of the Rings: The Battle for Middle-earth II, its sequel
 The Lord of the Rings: Conquest, an action video game by Pandemic Studios
 The Lord of the Rings: The Card Game, a card game by Fantasy Flight Games
 The Lord of the Rings Online, an MMORPG video game by Turbine
 The Lord of the Rings Roleplaying Game, a CODA role-playing game by Decipher
 The Lord of the Rings Strategy Battle Game, a tabletop miniature wargame by Games Workshop
 The Lord of the Rings Trading Card Game, a collectible card game by Decipher
 The Lord of the Rings: War in the North, a role-playing video game by Snowblind Studios

Music 
 Music Inspired by Lord of the Rings, a 1970 album by Swedish rock musician Bo Hansson
 The Lord of the Rings (soundtrack), the soundtrack for the 1978 Ralph Bakshi film
 Symphony No. 1 "The Lord of the Rings" (1988), a five-piece set for concert band by Johan de Meij
 "Lord of the Rings", a song by Blind Guardian from Tales from the Twilight World (1990)
 Music of The Lord of the Rings film series, the soundtrack for the 2001-2003 Peter Jackson films

Radio series 
 The Lord of the Rings (1955 radio series), a BBC radio series
 The Lord of the Rings (1979 radio series), an American NPR series
 The Lord of the Rings (1981 radio series), a BBC radio series

Television and theater
 The Lord of the Rings: The Rings of Power, a television series produced by Amazon Studios
 Lord of the Rings (musical), a live theatrical production

People 
 Yuri van Gelder, Dutch gymnast nicknamed "Lord of the Rings"

See also 
 Der Herr der Ringe, a 1992 German radio series on SDR and WDR